Cirkus is a 2022 Indian Hindi-language period comedy film directed and produced by Rohit Shetty. The film is jointly produced by Rohit Shetty Productionz and T-Series. The film stars Ranveer Singh and Varun Sharma in dual roles alongside Pooja Hegde and Jacqueline Fernandez. In the film, two sets of identical twins mixed up at birth encounter each other as adults.

Cirkus is the fifth installment of Golmaal franchise, a spin-off to 2017 film Golmaal Again and remake of the 1982 Hindi film Angoor which itself was based on William Shakespeare's play The Comedy of Errors. Principal photography for the film began in November 2020 at Mumbai and also took place in Ooty.

Cirkus was released theatrically on 23rd December 2022. The film was panned by critics and became a major commercial failure.

Plot 
In 1944, Dr. Roy Jamnadas (Murali Sharma), who is working on the theory of nature vs nurture, separates two sets of identical twins he finds at the doorstep of the orphanage he runs and gives them up for adoption to two different families, based in two different cities. One pair is given to a couple in Ooty and the other pair to a couple in Bangalore, and both the couples name them Roy and Joy, after Dr. Roy and his own adoptive brother Joy. Roy 1 (Ranveer Singh) and Joy 1 (Varun Sharma)'s father runs a circus and after his death, they both take up the responsibility of running the circus. Roy 2 and Joy 2's father is a rich industrialist. Roy 1 has a strange connection with electricity and electric currents do not affect him. He uses this ability to show tricks at the circus and becomes famously known as 'Electric Man'. Elsewhere, Roy 2 receives electric shocks whenever Roy 1 comes into contact with electricity.

The story then moves forward 30 years. Roy 1's wife, Mala (Pooja Hegde), cannot conceive and wishes to adopt a child from the Jamnadas Orphanage, but Roy 1 is against the idea. Roy 2 is in love with Bindu but her father Rai Bahadur is sceptical about him as he had seen Roy 1 with Mala in Ooty and had mistaken him for Roy 2, thinking that he is cheating on Bindu. Roy 2 and Joy 2 come to Ooty to buy a tea estate and there is a lot of confusion and misunderstanding as people mistake them for the other pair of twins. Three robbers - Momo, Mango and Chikki are after them to rob their money. They back off when Roy 2 gives them electric shocks and their boss, Polson Dada later comes to take revenge. They also come across Nagmani, the shady cab driver and Bagheera, the dacoit turned hotel owner. Roy 2 thinks they are all part of a huge criminal gang who want to rob them, and when they happen to come across Mala, they think that she is the leader of the gang.

Roy 1 decides to gift a diamond necklace to Mala but the jeweler mistakenly gives it to Roy 2, creating further confusion. Moreover, Bindu's father is now convinced that Roy 2 is married to Mala. On hearing this, Bindu threatens to end her relationship with him, not knowing that Mala is actually Roy 1's wife. All the confusion is cleared when both the pairs of twins come face to face at the circus and Dr. Jamnadas reveals the truth to them and his real intention behind separating them. They all reconcile and Roy 1 and Mala finally adopt a child from the orphanage and Roy 2 and Bindu plan to get married soon.

Later, five orphan boys - Gopal, Laxman 1, Madhav, Laxman 2 and Lucky come to stay at the orphanage, hinting the events before Golmaal Again.

Cast 
 Ranveer Singh as Roy Chohan and Roy Shenoy (dual role)
 Pooja Hegde as Mala Chohan, wife of Roy Chohan
 Jacqueline Fernandez as Bindu, girlfriend of Roy Shenoy 
 Varun Sharma as Joy Chohan and Joy Shenoy (dual role)
 Murali Sharma as Dr. Roy Jamnadas 
 Sanjay Mishra as Rai Bahadur, father of Bindu
 Ashwini Kalsekar as Shakuntala Shenoy, mother of Roy Shenoy and Joy Shenoy
 Johnny Lever as Polson Dada
 Siddhartha Jadhav as Momo
 Mukesh Tiwari as Daaku Bagheera
 Radhika Bangia as Lily
 Vrajesh Hirjee as Naag mani, a taxi driver
 Tiku Talsania as Veljibhai, a jeweller
 Vijay Patkar as Shankar
 Brijendra Kala as Yusuf
 Anil Charanjeett as Prem
 Uday Tikekar as Joy Jamnadas
 Sulabha Arya as Chachi
 Umakant Patil as Chikki
 Ashish Warang as Mango
 Nikitin Dheer as Dev Chohan, late father of Roy Chohan and Joy Chohan (cameo appearance)
 Deepika Padukone as Vrindama (special appearance in song "Current Laga Re")

Production 
Principal photography began on 17 November 2020 in Mumbai. Film production was halted during the final schedule in April 2021 as shootings were stopped in Mumbai, due to the second wave of COVID-19, and the final schedule resumed in Ooty around November 2021 and was completed within December 2021. Some patchwork also took place in July 2022. The entire filming for Cirkus was wrapped up in November 2022. The trailer of the film was released on 2 December 2022 worldwide.

Music

The score is composed by Amar Mohile and the songs were written by Devi Sri Prasad, Badshah and Lijo George-DJ Chetas. The first single titled "Current Laga Re" was released on 8 December 2022. The second single "Sun Zara", sung by Papon and Shreya Ghoshal released on 16 December 2022. The third single "Aashiqui", sung by Badshah and Amrita Singh released on 21 December. The score was composed by Amar Mohile.

Release

Theatrical
Cirkus was theatrically released on 23 December 2022. It was initially scheduled for 31 December 2021, during New Year, and then on 15 July 2022, but were unable due to production delays via COVID-19 pandemic. In May 2022, the new release date with first official poster was announced — 23 December 2022, thus eyeing Christmas Eve.

Home media
The film was digitally premiered on Netflix from 17 February 2023.

Reception

Box office 
The film collected ₹6.25 crore in India on its opening day. In its first week, the film made ₹27.95 crore net in India. As of 10 January 2023, the film has collected ₹38.21 crore in India and ₹19.03 crore overseas for a worldwide total of ₹57.24 crore. The film turned out to be a box-office bomb.

Critical response 
On the Rotten Tomatoes, Cirkus has a 0% score based on 11 reviews, with an average rating of 3.40/10.

Anupama Chopra of Film Companion said "Cirkus is a mess. The writers did not do any work to differentiate Singh's and Sharma's double-role characters." Taran Adarsh of Bollywood Hungama gave the film 2 out of 5 stars and tweeted, "Lacks entertainment and humour you associate with a #RohitShetty film… Has some funny moments [second half], but the spark is missing." Komal Nahta of Film information called the script "terribly weak" and concluded "Cirkus is a poor fare." Bollywood Hungama rated it with 2 out 5, "Cirkus suffers from poor writing and forced humour, and appeals only in bits and pieces".

NDTVs reviewer felt that, "Cirkus have same drawback as other Bollywood films have nowadays, its seems that it have no respect for audience, Cirkus is abysmally bad film, it may remind audience Awara (1951) of Raj Kapoor', referring to its upbringing theme similar Awara. Ranveer Singh's both roles are insipid, this film's comic gags are pathetically unfunny, pointing on technical aspects he wrote that, its gaudy colour pallets made to appear film's real background like painted one. Maharashtra Times Abhishek Khude rated it by 2/5, wrote 'The atmosphere, background in this film looked fake, it have theme of Golmaal Again (2017), Singh did acting in his typical one tone, Shetty tried to generate humour by actor's wired body movements and tasteless dialogues, few scenes are humorous, probably kids will enjoy this picture. Shubra Gupta of The Indian Express, rated it by 1.5/5, wrote 'Ranveer Singh-Rohit Shetty film is surprisingly blah', Cirkus have cliche. She saw similar elements which Rohit Shetty everytime insert in his films to create humour from his multiple editions of Golmaal onwards, this film have over-the-top hilarity - Shetty style, in most part of it humour gags does not landed, some places it gives lectures to audience.

The Hindu's reviewer Anuj Kumar, wrote in his review article that, Rohit Shetty used lots of Bollywood clichés such as Kali pahadi, Rai Sahab but nothing created laughter, Jacqueline Fernandez- Puja Hegde looked like this film's glittering sets that shines a lot but add less worth, Cirkus is reckless ruckus in Ooty. Jadhav have prominent role, Fizzle generated when Lever appeared, he have 2-3 laugh moments the way Sanjay Mishra have in it. ABP News reviewer expressed that, Ranbir Singh, Varun Sharma's both characters are serious in this film and felt responsibility to generate humour was on Siddharth Jadhav- Sanjay Mishra, felt like supporting actors trying to do forced comedy, this film's plot is based on mistaken identity of two twin brother's set. The Quint's Pratiksha Mishra gave rating of 1.5 out of 5, wrote Cirkus's script is predictable, almost evey part of this film have done before,  such as trio of thieves (you already saw them in Golmaal 3 (2010) led by Pappi Bhai), the climax scene (similar to Phir Hera Pheri) bring forth just a few instances this film have a lot of these . Johny Lever, Varun Sharma and Sanjay Mishra etc. tried to make us laugh but writing is weak, it did not supported them. She criticized editing (due to slow motion scenes) and dialogues.

Calling the film predictable and unoriginal, Anna M. M. Vetticad of Firstpost wrote, "There's only so far that an actor’s innate talent, nostalgia and kitschy images can take a film. Soon enough, Cirkus blurs the line between imitation and tribute, until the fun completely ceases." In her 1.75/5-rated review, she added a note of praise towards Shetty's continued use of the Tamil language, stating “Ironically, Rohit Shetty’s much-lambasted comedies give us more authenticity in the use of language in southern Indian settings than most commercial Hindi cinema bothers with."

Vivek M.V. of Deccan Herald rated it by 1.5 out of 5 stars, wrote it is an ultra-boring film, opposite to its name it does not have any memorable circus acts, it have terrible jokes, gaudy colour tone which strain your eyes. "This is Rohit Shetty's worst film yet". Rediff reviewed this film and rated it 2 out of 5 stars, wrote it is a "boring" film, pointed out errors in performers : Varun Sharma did bad work, Pooja Hegde did expressionless acting, what was Jacqueline Fernandez and Sharma was doing in this film? But wrote Sanjay Mishra - Sidharth Jadhav hold the film together. Mishra also fall flat in 1st half but was better than it in later half. Ronak Kotecha of The Times of India gave the film 2 out of 5 stars and wrote, "Cirkus is a busy film filled with a battery of characters put together with a purpose to make us laugh, but is far from that. Entertaining the audience with slapstick comedy and drama is a tightrope that Rohit Shetty has successfully walked before but this time he seems to have tripped several times along the way."

Rating the film 2/5, India Today critic Tushar Joshi wrote, "The issue with Cirkus is that it feels outdated. Not because it’s set in the 60’s, but the formula is cliched. The VFX in some scenes looks amateurish and the music, unlike Shetty’s previous films, is a big downer. There is no harm in making a mindless comedy, but for it to work you need to have some solid writing to back your effort". He added, "In Cirkus, the writing is average and the only time the film picks tempo is when the supporting cast delivers. Jacqueline Fernandez and Pooja Hegde have very little to offer. Ranveer in dual roles gives his best, but he is let down by a weak script that doesn’t do justice to his efforts." Monika Rawal of Hindustan Times in her review said, Cirkus is an awaful film, it have no comedy, Rohit Shetty appears to stuck in days of Golmaal (2006), there are endless characters in it and everyone did overacting, Ranveer Singh tried to be funny but his jokes did not land. Jacqueline is no better here and doesn't get to do much other than be just a prop adding some glam quotient. Tina Das of ThePrint wrote that this film have confusing narrative and it is extremely boring, Cirkus have too many characters and it created chaos thus became unfunny, Rohit Shetty's this film is one of the worst film of this year along with Liger and Heropanti 2.

See also 
 List of films based around twins

References

External links 
 

Films set in 1942
Films set in 1960
Films shot in Ooty
Films directed by Rohit Shetty
Films shot in Mumbai
2020s Hindi-language films
Films based on The Comedy of Errors
2022 comedy films
Indian slapstick comedy films
Twins in Indian films
Films about twins
Films postponed due to the COVID-19 pandemic
T-Series (company) films
Reliance Entertainment films